Thomas Laclayat (born 2 October 1997) is a French rugby union player, who plays as a tighthead prop for Oyonnax Rugby.

Career
After a Barbarian F.C. invitation, Thomas Laclayat was called by Fabien Galthié to the French national team for the first time in June 2022, for the summer tour of Japan.

References

External links
 All.Rugby
 It's Rugby

1997 births
People from Ain
Living people
French rugby union players
Rugby union props
Oyonnax Rugby players